Badal Amayakovich Muradyan (1915–1991) was the Prime Minister of the Armenian SSR (1966–1972).

Background 
Badal Muradyan was born in 1915, in Vardashen village of Armavir marz, Armenia. He attended the Yerevan Polytechnics University and became a chemist. Since around 1956, he worked as the first secretary in the Yerevan city committee of the ACP (Armenian Communist Party).

He become the Prime Minister of the Armenian SSR from 1966 to 1972, during Brezhnev's “standstill." He stepped down in 1972 due to the state of his health.

From 1976 to 1981, he worked in the “Nairit” factory in Kirov, Russia. He died in 1991.

Memorial 

There is plaque on Moskovyan street in Yerevan, Armenia for his memorial. There is a street named after him in Yerevan, Armenia.

References 

1915 births
1991 deaths
People from Armavir, Armenia
Armenian communists
Armenian politicians